Michel Padovani (born 21 January 1962) is a retired French football midfielder and later manager. He is the current assistant manager of AJ Auxerre.

References

1962 births
Living people
French footballers
SC Bastia players
FC Libourne players
Ligue 1 players
Ligue 2 players
Association football midfielders
French football managers
SC Bastia managers
Ligue 1 managers
Ligue 2 managers
French people of Italian descent
Sportspeople from Haute-Corse
Footballers from Corsica